Tillandsia subg. Tillandsia is a subgenus of the genus Tillandsia.

Species
Species accepted by Encyclopedia of Bromeliads as of October 2022:

Tillandsia abbreviata 
Tillandsia achyrostachys 
Tillandsia acuminata 
Tillandsia adamsii 
Tillandsia adpressiflora 
Tillandsia aequatorialis 
Tillandsia aguascalientensis 
Tillandsia albida 
Tillandsia alfredo-laui 
Tillandsia alto-mayoensis 
Tillandsia alvareziae 
Tillandsia andreana 
Tillandsia andrieuxii 
Tillandsia antillana 
Tillandsia arenicola 
Tillandsia argentea 
Tillandsia ariza-juliae 
Tillandsia arroyoensis 
Tillandsia atenangoensis 
Tillandsia atitlanensis 
Tillandsia atroviolacea 
Tillandsia australis 
Tillandsia baileyi 
Tillandsia bakiorum 
Tillandsia balbisiana 
Tillandsia baliophylla 
Tillandsia barbeyana 
Tillandsia bartramii 
Tillandsia belloensis 
Tillandsia biflora 
Tillandsia bochilensis 
Tillandsia boliviana 
Tillandsia bongarana 
Tillandsia borealis 
Tillandsia borinquensis 
Tillandsia borjaensis 
Tillandsia botterii 
Tillandsia bourgaei 
Tillandsia brachycaulos 
Tillandsia brenneri 
Tillandsia brevilingua 
Tillandsia brevior 
Tillandsia breviturneri 
Tillandsia bulbosa 
Tillandsia buseri 
Tillandsia butzii 
Tillandsia cajamarcensis 
Tillandsia calcicola 
Tillandsia califani 
Tillandsia callichroma 
Tillandsia calochlamys 
Tillandsia calothyrsus 
Tillandsia caloura 
Tillandsia candelifera 
Tillandsia canescens 
Tillandsia capistranoensis 
Tillandsia capitata 
Tillandsia caput-medusae 
Tillandsia carlos-hankii 
Tillandsia carlsoniae 
Tillandsia carnosa 
Tillandsia carrierei 
Tillandsia carrilloi 
Tillandsia cauliflora 
Tillandsia cauligera 
Tillandsia cees-goudae 
Tillandsia celata 
Tillandsia cernua 
Tillandsia cerosa 
Tillandsia cerrateana 
Tillandsia chaetophylla 
Tillandsia chalcatzingensis 
Tillandsia chapalillaensis 
Tillandsia chartacea 
Tillandsia chiapensis 
Tillandsia chlorophylla 
Tillandsia churinensis 
Tillandsia circinnatioides 
Tillandsia clavigera 
Tillandsia coalcomanensis 
Tillandsia coinaensis 
Tillandsia comitanensis 
Tillandsia compacta 
Tillandsia complachroma 
Tillandsia complamergens 
Tillandsia complanata 
Tillandsia complarensis 
Tillandsia concolor 
Tillandsia confertiflora 
Tillandsia confinis 
Tillandsia copalaensis 
Tillandsia copanensis 
Tillandsia cossonii 
Tillandsia cretacea 
Tillandsia crista-galli 
Tillandsia cryptantha 
Tillandsia cryptopoda 
Tillandsia cuatrecasasii 
Tillandsia cucaensis 
Tillandsia cucullata 
Tillandsia dasyliriifolia 
Tillandsia deflexa 
Tillandsia delicata 
Tillandsia demissa 
Tillandsia denudata 
Tillandsia deppeana 
Tillandsia dexteri 
Tillandsia dichromantha 
Tillandsia dichrophylla 
Tillandsia diguetii 
Tillandsia disticha 
Tillandsia divaricata 
Tillandsia dorotheehaseae 
Tillandsia dugesii 
Tillandsia dura 
Tillandsia durangensis 
Tillandsia ecarinata 
Tillandsia edithae 
Tillandsia ehlersiana 
Tillandsia eistetteri 
Tillandsia eizii 
Tillandsia elizabethae 
Tillandsia elongata 
Tillandsia elusiva 
Tillandsia elvirae-grossiae 
Tillandsia emergens 
Tillandsia ermitae 
Tillandsia erubescens 
Tillandsia escahuascensis 
Tillandsia excavata 
Tillandsia excelsa 
Tillandsia exserta 
Tillandsia extensa 
Tillandsia fasciculata 
Tillandsia fascifolia 
Tillandsia fassettii 
Tillandsia fendlanata 
Tillandsia fendleri 
Tillandsia ferreyrae 
Tillandsia ferrisiana 
Tillandsia festucoides 
Tillandsia filifolia 
Tillandsia flabellata 
Tillandsia flagellata 
Tillandsia flavobracteata 
Tillandsia flexuosa 
Tillandsia floresensis 
Tillandsia floribunda 
Tillandsia foliosa 
Tillandsia francisci 
Tillandsia fresnilloensis 
Tillandsia fuchsii 
Tillandsia funckiana 
Tillandsia fusiformis 
Tillandsia gerd-muelleri 
Tillandsia glabrior 
Tillandsia glauca 
Tillandsia gloriae 
Tillandsia glossophylla 
Tillandsia gracillima 
Tillandsia graebeneri 
Tillandsia grovesiae 
Tillandsia guatemalensis 
Tillandsia guenther-nolleri 
Tillandsia guerreroensis 
Tillandsia gymnobotrya 
Tillandsia hammeri 
Tillandsia harrisii 
Tillandsia heliconioides 
Tillandsia heterophylla 
Tillandsia hildae 
Tillandsia hintoniana 
Tillandsia hirtzii 
Tillandsia hoeijeri 
Tillandsia hondurensis 
Tillandsia hotteana 
Tillandsia hromadnikiana 
Tillandsia huajuapanensis 
Tillandsia huamelulaensis 
Tillandsia huarazensis 
Tillandsia humboldtii 
Tillandsia ilseana 
Tillandsia imperialis 
Tillandsia imporaensis 
Tillandsia incarnata 
Tillandsia indigofera 
Tillandsia intermedia 
Tillandsia interrupta 
Tillandsia ionantha 
Tillandsia ionochroma 
Tillandsia izabalensis 
Tillandsia jaguactalensis 
Tillandsia jaliscopinicola 
Tillandsia joel-mandimboensis 
Tillandsia juerg-rutschmannii 
Tillandsia juncea 
Tillandsia kalmbacheri 
Tillandsia kammii 
Tillandsia karwinskyana 
Tillandsia kauffmannii 
Tillandsia kegeliana 
Tillandsia kessleri 
Tillandsia kirchhoffiana 
Tillandsia klausii 
Tillandsia koideae 
Tillandsia kolbii 
Tillandsia krahnii 
Tillandsia kretzii 
Tillandsia krukoffiana 
Tillandsia kuntzeana 
Tillandsia lagunaensis 
Tillandsia lajensis 
Tillandsia laminata 
Tillandsia lampropoda 
Tillandsia langlasseana 
Tillandsia latifolia 
Tillandsia laui 
Tillandsia lautneri 
Tillandsia leiboldiana 
Tillandsia leucolepis 
Tillandsia limae 
Tillandsia limarum 
Tillandsia limbata 
Tillandsia lineatispica 
Tillandsia loma-blancae 
Tillandsia longifolia 
Tillandsia lopezii 
Tillandsia loxensis 
Tillandsia loxichaensis 
Tillandsia lucida 
Tillandsia lydiae 
Tillandsia lymanii 
Tillandsia macdougallii 
Tillandsia machupicchuensis 
Tillandsia macrochlamys 
Tillandsia macrodactylon 
Tillandsia maculata 
Tillandsia macvaughii 
Tillandsia magnusiana 
Tillandsia makoyana 
Tillandsia makrinii 
Tillandsia malzinei 
Tillandsia marabascoensis 
Tillandsia marnieri-lapostollei 
Tillandsia mateoensis 
Tillandsia matudae 
Tillandsia maya 
Tillandsia may-patii 
Tillandsia mazatlanensis 
Tillandsia melanocrater 
Tillandsia micans 
Tillandsia mima 
Tillandsia mirabilis 
Tillandsia mitlaensis 
Tillandsia mixtecorum 
Tillandsia mooreana 
Tillandsia moronesensis 
Tillandsia moscosoi 
Tillandsia multicaulis 
Tillandsia naundorffiae 
Tillandsia nervata 
Tillandsia nervisepala 
Tillandsia nicolasensis 
Tillandsia nizandaensis 
Tillandsia nolleriana 
Tillandsia novakii 
Tillandsia nuyooensis 
Tillandsia oaxacana 
Tillandsia occulta 
Tillandsia oerstediana 
Tillandsia orbicularis 
Tillandsia orogenes 
Tillandsia oroyensis 
Tillandsia ortgiesiana 
Tillandsia ovatispicata 
Tillandsia oxapampae 
Tillandsia pachyaxon 
Tillandsia pacifica 
Tillandsia pallescens 
Tillandsia pamelae 
Tillandsia paniculata 
Tillandsia paraensis 
Tillandsia paraisoensis 
Tillandsia parryi 
Tillandsia parvispica 
Tillandsia pastensis 
Tillandsia paucifolia 
Tillandsia penascoensis 
Tillandsia pentasticha 
Tillandsia pinicola 
Tillandsia pinnatodigitata 
Tillandsia plagiotropica 
Tillandsia platyphylla 
Tillandsia polita 
Tillandsia polyantha 
Tillandsia polystachia 
Tillandsia pomacochae 
Tillandsia ponderosa 
Tillandsia porvenirensis 
Tillandsia praschekii 
Tillandsia pringlei 
Tillandsia prodigiosa 
Tillandsia propagulifera 
Tillandsia pruinosa 
Tillandsia pseudobaileyi 
Tillandsia pseudofloribunda 
Tillandsia pseudomicans 
Tillandsia pseudooaxacana 
Tillandsia pseudosetacea 
Tillandsia pueblensis 
Tillandsia punctulata 
Tillandsia purpurascens 
Tillandsia pyramidata 
Tillandsia quaquaflorifera 
Tillandsia queretaroensis 
Tillandsia queroensis 
Tillandsia raackii 
Tillandsia racinae 
Tillandsia rangelensis 
Tillandsia rariflora 
Tillandsia rauhii 
Tillandsia rauschii 
Tillandsia rayonesensis 
Tillandsia religiosa 
Tillandsia remota 
Tillandsia renateae 
Tillandsia restrepoana 
Tillandsia reuteri 
Tillandsia reversa 
Tillandsia rhodocephala 
Tillandsia rhodosticta 
Tillandsia rhomboidea 
Tillandsia riohondoensis 
Tillandsia riverae 
Tillandsia rodrigueziana 
Tillandsia roezlii 
Tillandsia roland-gosselinii 
Tillandsia romeroi 
Tillandsia roseoscapa 
Tillandsia roseospicata 
Tillandsia rothii 
Tillandsia rotundata 
Tillandsia rubella 
Tillandsia rubia 
Tillandsia rubrispica 
Tillandsia rubroviolacea 
Tillandsia rudolfii 
Tillandsia rusbyi 
Tillandsia sagasteguii 
Tillandsia salmonea 
Tillandsia samaipatensis 
Tillandsia sangii 
Tillandsia santieusebii 
Tillandsia santosiae 
Tillandsia scaposa 
Tillandsia sceptriformis 
Tillandsia schatzlii 
Tillandsia schiedeana 
Tillandsia schimperiana 
Tillandsia schreiteri 
Tillandsia schultzei 
Tillandsia schusteri 
Tillandsia secunda 
Tillandsia seleriana 
Tillandsia selleana 
Tillandsia sessemocinoi 
Tillandsia setacea 
Tillandsia setiformis 
Tillandsia sierrahalensis 
Tillandsia sierrajuarezensis 
Tillandsia sigmoidea 
Tillandsia simulata 
Tillandsia socialis 
Tillandsia sodiroi 
Tillandsia somnians 
Tillandsia sphaerocephala 
Tillandsia spiraliflora 
Tillandsia standleyi 
Tillandsia steiropoda 
Tillandsia stenlanata 
Tillandsia stenoura 
Tillandsia stipitata 
Tillandsia stoltenii 
Tillandsia streptophylla 
Tillandsia subconcolor 
Tillandsia subinflata 
Tillandsia subteres 
Tillandsia subulifera 
Tillandsia suescana 
Tillandsia suesilliae 
Tillandsia superba 
Tillandsia superinsignis 
Tillandsia supermexicana 
Tillandsia takizawae 
Tillandsia taxcoensis 
Tillandsia tecolometl 
Tillandsia tecpanensis 
Tillandsia tehuacana 
Tillandsia teres 
Tillandsia thyrsigera 
Tillandsia tillii 
Tillandsia tonalaensis 
Tillandsia tovarensis 
Tillandsia tragophoba 
Tillandsia trauneri 
Tillandsia tricolor 
Tillandsia trigalensis 
Tillandsia truxillana 
Tillandsia turneri 
Tillandsia turquinensis 
Tillandsia ulrici 
Tillandsia ultima 
Tillandsia utriculata 
Tillandsia vanhyningii 
Tillandsia variabilis 
Tillandsia veleziana 
Tillandsia velickiana 
Tillandsia velutina 
Tillandsia ventanaensis 
Tillandsia verapazana 
Tillandsia vicentina 
Tillandsia violacea 
Tillandsia violascens 
Tillandsia vriesioides 
Tillandsia walteri 
Tillandsia weberi 
Tillandsia werdermannii 
Tillandsia werner-rauhiana 
Tillandsia wilinskii 
Tillandsia wisdomiana 
Tillandsia wuelfinghoffii 
Tillandsia wurdackii 
Tillandsia xerographica 
Tillandsia yerba-santae 
Tillandsia yunckeri 
Tillandsia yutaninoensis 
Tillandsia zacapanensis 
Tillandsia zacualpanensis 
Tillandsia zaragozaensis 
Tillandsia zaratensis 
Tillandsia zarumensis 
Tillandsia zoquensis

References

Plant subgenera
Tillandsia